Elli is an electoral ward for Llanelli Town Council and Carmarthenshire County Council in Llanelli, Wales. 

The ward covers a residential area in the north of Llanelli, bounded to the south by Parc y Dref, to the east by Old Road and to the west by Llanelli Rural. The population of this ward at the 2011 census was 3,203.

Representation
Elli was an electoral ward to Dyfed County Council, represented by a Labour Party councillor from the 1989 election followed by a Liberal Democrat councillor from 1993.

Since 1995 Elli has been an electoral ward to Carmarthenshire County Council, represented by one county councillor.

Elli is also one of the community wards to Llanelli Town Council, electing two town councillors.

Future Lord Chancellor and Secretary of State for Wales, Robert Buckland, began his political career when he won the Elli county seat by only 3 votes in 1993. It was said he was the first Conservative to be elected in Llanelli in living memory. 

Conservative councillor John Jenkins won the Elli ward at the 2004 Carmarthenshire County Council election. In February 2006 he was selected as the Conservative candidate for Carmarthen West and South Pembrokeshire in the 2007 Welsh Assembly election, but stood down after 24 hours because of homophobic remarks made in 2003. He was re-elected as Elli councillor in 2008 as an Independent. He was elected again in 2012, but later that year was reported to the Ombudsman for inappropriate comments on Twitter.

References

Llanelli
Carmarthenshire electoral wards